Sílvio José Cardoso Reis Júnior (born 1 July 1990, in Guajará-Mirim), commonly known as Silvinho, is a Brazilian left winger who plays for São Bernardo.

Honours
 Monte Azul
Campeonato Paulista Série A2: 2009

CSA
Campeonato Alagoano: 2021

References

External links

CBF profile

1990 births
Living people
Brazilian footballers
Atlético Monte Azul players
Clube Atlético Bragantino players
Comercial Futebol Clube (Ribeirão Preto) players
LASK players
Clube Atlético Penapolense players
São Paulo FC players
Associação Atlética Ponte Preta players
Criciúma Esporte Clube players
Joinville Esporte Clube players
Associação Chapecoense de Futebol players
Seongnam FC players
Campeonato Brasileiro Série A players
Campeonato Brasileiro Série B players
K League 1 players
Brazilian expatriate footballers
Expatriate footballers in Austria
Expatriate footballers in South Korea
Brazilian expatriate sportspeople in South Korea
Association football forwards
J2 League players
Albirex Niigata players
Centro Sportivo Alagoano players
São Bernardo Futebol Clube players